Sheila Curran Harrington (born September 8, 1960) is an American politician and attorney.  She represented the 1st Middlesex district in the Massachusetts House of Representatives from 2011 until February 2022, when she resigned to take up the position of Clerk Magistrate of the Gardner District Court. She is a member of the Republican party.

Her district included the towns of Groton, Dunstable, Pepperell, Townsend, Ashby and a precinct in Ayer and Devens.
She served as Ranking Member on the Judiciary Committee and as a member of both the Committee on Rules and the House Committee on Personnel and Administration. She had previously served as the Ranking Member on the House Post Audit and Oversight Committee and as a Member of the Veterans and Federal Affairs Committee.

Early life and education
Sheila Harrington was born in Salem, Massachusetts and grew up in Danvers, Massachusetts. She attended high school in Peabody at Bishop Fenwick High School She then attended Providence College and earned a Bachelor of Arts in Social Work in 1982. Following college, she attended the New England School of Law and was admitted to the Massachusetts Bar in 1986.

Career
Sheila has been a practicing attorney in Massachusetts for over 30 years. She continues to have a law practice in Groton, Massachusetts along with two other attorneys.

One of Harrington's most notable positions is her stance on Transgender rights. In an op-ed from the Lowell Sun she documented how she came to change her position from opposition to support of transgender rights., how after "passionately protesting a bill on the Massachusetts House Floor", she came to realize, that was wrong in her own mind.

In an op-ed from the Lowell Sun, Harrington described how she came to change her position from opposition to support of transgender rights.

Electoral history

See also
 2019–2020 Massachusetts legislature
 2021–2022 Massachusetts legislature

References

External links

Living people
Providence College alumni
New England Law Boston alumni
Republican Party members of the Massachusetts House of Representatives
Women state legislators in Massachusetts
21st-century American politicians
21st-century American women politicians
Politicians from Salem, Massachusetts
People from Danvers, Massachusetts
People from Groton, Massachusetts
Bishop Fenwick High School (Peabody, Massachusetts) alumni
1960 births